The 2nd Independent Mixed Brigade or 2nd Mixed Brigade of the Imperial Japanese Army was formed on 10 February 1938, from five battalions already attached to the Mongolia Garrison Army, of the 109th Division (first formation)

Organization 
2nd Independent Mixed Brigade
 2nd Independent Infantry Battalion
 3rd Independent Infantry Battalion
 4th Independent Infantry Battalion
 5th Independent Infantry Battalion
 312th Independent Infantry Battalion (Imperial Japanese Army)
 Artillery Troops
 Signal Troops

See also
Independent Mixed Brigades (Imperial Japanese Army)

References

Independent Mixed Brigades (Imperial Japanese Army)
Military units and formations established in 1938
Military units and formations disestablished in 1940
1938 establishments in Japan
1940 disestablishments in Japan